Bruna Rafagnin Calderan (born 12 September 1996), simply known as Bruna, is a Brazilian footballer who plays as a right back for Palmeiras and the Brazil women's national team.

International career
Bruna represented Brazil at the 2016 FIFA U-20 Women's World Cup. She made her senior debut in 2019.

References

External links

1996 births
Living people
Women's association football fullbacks
Brazilian women's footballers
Sportspeople from Rio Grande do Sul
Brazil women's international footballers
Avaí FC players
Sociedade Esportiva Kindermann players
Sociedade Esportiva Palmeiras (women) players